Henry Martin (born April 11, 1997) is an American soccer player who played as a defender for Princeton University.

Career

Early career
Martin began his career with the Manhattan Kickers before joining the New York Red Bulls youth set-up. In early 2015 it was announced that Martin had chosen to attend Princeton University and represent the Princeton Tigers.

Professional
Before attending Princeton and after a couple years of representing the reserves, Martin made his debut for the New York Red Bulls II against the Harrisburg City Islanders on July 18, 2015. He came on as an 86th-minute substitute for Mike da Fonte as the Red Bulls II won 2–0.

National team
Martin was called on 7 October 2015 in the United States national under-20 soccer team, for the Mercedes-Benz Elite Cup in Stuttgart vs Germany national under-19 football team, Mexico national under-20 football team and the Scotland national under-19 football team. He played his debut for the U-20 in a friendly game vs Germany on 7 October 2015.

Career statistics

References

External links
Princeton bio

1997 births
Living people
American soccer players
Princeton Tigers men's soccer players
New York Red Bulls II players
Association football defenders
Soccer players from New York (state)
USL Championship players
United States men's under-20 international soccer players